Abu'l-Abbas Ahmad ibn Abdallah al-Muqtadi usually known simply by his regnal name Al-Mustazhir billah (b. April/May 1078 – 6 August 1118 d.) was the Abbasid Caliph in Baghdad from 1094 to 1118. He succeeded his father al-Muqtadi as the Caliph. The main and important events during his reign are; appearance of the First Crusade in Western Syria, Muslim protest in Baghdad against crusaders, His efforts to help Mawdud to organized several expeditions to reconquer lands from the Crusaders.

Biography 
Al-Mustazhir's father was caliph Al-Muqtadi. Al-Muqtadi had one concubine, Taif Al-Afwah. She was an Egyptian, and was the mother of his son, the future Caliph Al-Mustazhir. He was born in 1078 CE (the 5th Islamic century). Al-Mustazhir's full name was Ahmad ibn Abdallah al-Muqtadi and his Kenya was Abu'l-Abbas. 

When his father died on 3 February 1094 at the age of 37 – 38. Al-Mustazhir succeeded him. At the time of accession to the throne, he was just sixteen years old.

Amid ad-Dawla would remain Abbasid vizier until 1099 or 1100, when he was removed from office and imprisoned by the Seljuk sultan Berkyaruq. There are different accounts for Amid ad-Dawla's downfall – in one, Mu'ayyad al-Mulk, who had succeeded his father Nizam al-Mulk as Seljuk vizier, had offered the Abbasid vizierate to al-A'azz, and the two collaborated to remove him from office without input from Barkyaruq. In another, Barkyaruq himself fired Amid ad-Dawla and fined him "an enormous sum" for misappropriating government funds before imprisoning him. In any case, Amid ad-Dawla died in prison shortly after, in 1100.

After Amid ad-Dawla's downfall, his brother al-Kafi served as vizier to the Abbasid caliph al-Mustazhir from 1102/3 until 1106/7 and then again from 1108/9 until 1113/4.

During Al-Mustazhir's twenty-four year incumbency he was politically irrelevant, despite the civil strife at home and the appearance of the First Crusade in Syria. An attempt was even made by crusader Raymond IV of Toulouse to attack Baghdad, but he was defeated near Mersivan during the Crusade of 1101. The global Muslim population had climbed to about 5 per cent as against the Christian population of 11 per cent by 1100.

In the year 492 AH (AD 1099), Jerusalem was captured by the crusaders and its inhabitants were massacred. Preachers travelled throughout the caliphate proclaiming the tragedy and rousing men to recover from infidel hands the Al-Aqsa Mosque, the scene of the Prophet's heavenly flight. But whatever the success elsewhere, the mission failed in the eastern provinces, which were occupied with their own troubles, and moreover cared little for the Holy Land, dominated as it then was by the Fatimid faith. Crowds of exiles, seeking refuge in Baghdad, joined there with the populace in crying out for war against the Franks (the name used by Muslims for the crusaders). For two Fridays in 1111 the insurgents, incited by Ibn al-Khashshab, the qadi of Aleppo, stormed the Great Mosque, broke the pulpit and throne of the caliph in pieces, and shouted down the service, but neither the sultan nor the caliph were interested in sending an army west.

Family
One of Al-Mustazhir's wives was Ismah Khatun. She was the daughter of Seljuk Sultan Malik-Shah I. Al-Mustazhir married her in Isfahan in 1108–9. She later came to Baghdad and took up residence in the Caliphal Palace. On 3 February 1112, she gave birth to Prince Abu Ishaq Ibrahim, who died of smallpox in October 1114, and was buried in the mausoleum of al-Muqtadir in Rusafah Cemetery, beside his uncle Ja'far, son of the caliph al-Muqtadi. Upon the death of Al-Mustazhir, Ismah returned to Isfahan, where she died, and was buried within the law college that she had founded there on Barracks Market Street. Another wife was Khatun. She was one of al-Mustazhir's favorites. She died in 1141–42. One of his concubines was Lubanah. She was from Baghdad, and was the mother of the future Caliph Al-Mustarshid. Another concubine was Ashin. She was from Syria, and was the mother of the future Caliph Al-Muqtafi.

Succession  
Al-Mustazhir died in the year 1118 at the age of 40. He was succeeded by his son Al-Mustarshid as the 29th Abbasid Caliph.

See also
 Al-Ghazali prominent and influential Muslim philosopher, theologian, jurist of Sunni Islam.
 Ibn Tahir of Caesarea was a Muslim historian and traditionist.

References

This text is adapted from William Muir's public domain, The Caliphate: Its Rise, Decline, and Fall.
 الدكتور, عبد القادر بوباية ،الأستاذ (2009). الاكتفاء في اخبار الخلفاء 1-2 ج2. الاكتفاء في اخبار الخلفاء 1-2. Dar Al Kotob Al Ilmiyah دار الكتب العلمية. p. 485

Muslims of the First Crusade
1078 births
1118 deaths
11th-century Abbasid caliphs
12th-century Abbasid caliphs
12th-century Arabic poets
People of the Nizari–Seljuk wars
Sons of Abbasid caliphs